Perfect Life  is Taiwanese Mandopop artist Yoga Lin's third Mandarin studio album. It was released on 6 May 2011 by HIM International Music.

Track listing

Music videos

 Good Night (晚安) (22/04/2011)  
 Freedom (想自由) (01/05/2011) 
 Wake Up (自然醒) (19/05/2011) 
 I Always Practice Alone (我總是一個人在練習一個人) (29/06/2011) 
 The Wonderful Life (美妙生活) (12/07/2011)

References

Yoga Lin albums
HIM International Music albums